is a planned anime series, written by Chiaki J. Konaka and featuring character designs by Yoshitoshi Abe. It is Abe and Konaka's third collaboration, following Texhnolyze and Serial Experiments Lain. Ryūtarō Nakamura, who directed Serial Experiments Lain, was tapped to direct Despera but died before production could begin. 

The title Despera is taken from a poem of the same title by Japanese Dadaist poet Jun Tsuji. Though the title of Tsuji's poem comes from the word "despair" or "desperation", the official blog for the anime stated that it can also imply the Spanish word desperado. A graphic novel serialization related to the anime was published in the Japanese magazine Animage from July 2009 to July 2010.

Story
The story centers around Ain, a 14-year-old girl who builds devices despite her lack of scientific or engineering background. An alternate history science fiction story, it is set in Tokyo during the Taishō era in 1922, one year before the 1923 Great Kantō earthquake.

Characters
  - A 14-year-old girl who resides in her workshop in the basement of the Ryōunkaku in Asakusa, Tokyo. A technical genius with no prior scientific knowledge, she is able to create electronic devices far beyond the capabilities of the current era. Some of the devices created include early versions of a modern computer, complete with typewriter keyboards and cathode ray tube display monitors. Despite being 14 years old, she often displays the maturity of an adult. She is also shown to be capable of generating electricity from her hands when she takes on a tank squadron later in the story.
  - A man in his 30s who is an associate of Ain's. In the prologue of the graphic novel, he claims to be able to see the future through the displays on Ain's computer monitors. He sells this information in the form of prophecies to the Japanese military and the aristocracy to gather funds for Ain's inventions. In the serialized version, he has no name and is only referred to as "the man", and his face is unseen throughout the illustrations. He is described as being emotionless, and only displays deep affection for Ain.
  - A military officer who works for the Japanese army's science institute. He holds the rank of second lieutenant. Enoki is sent to Asakusa to investigate the unstable electrical discharge occurring in the vicinity of the Ryōunkaku.
  - A Japanese nobleman with the title of viscount. It is unknown what relationship Kimiyasu has with Ain, but he is interested in her unorthodox inventions. He has a primary residence in Sanbanchō of Chiyoda-ku, and a second residence at the Kanda-Surugadai district.
  - A Russian woman of aristocratic origins, Barbara is a refugee who escaped from Harbin after the disownment of Russians by the Chinese Republic. She lives in the Kanda-Surugadai residence owned by Kimiyasu, who has taken her in. Ain is particularly uncomfortable in Barbara's presence, as she is frightened of her pale white complexion, presumably having never seen a Russian before.

Chapters
Thirteen chapters were released in serial form in the Animage magazine between July 2009 and July 2010. The complete novella was published as a single volume on April 28, 2011, and included new story content and illustrations.

Production

Abe announced at Sakura-Con 2009 development of a new anime, revealing that it would be set during Japan's Taishō era. Ryūtarō Nakamura, who had directed Serial Experiments Lain, was tapped to direct. Beginning in July, a graphic novel serialization penned by Konaka and Abe ran in the Japanese magazine Animage, terminating a year later.

In 2010, production of the anime was placed on hold due to Nakamura's health. On June 29, 2013, Nakamura died of pancreatic cancer, and it was unknown whether development of Despera would continue following his death. At Overload 2014, Abe announced that the anime would move forward with a new director.

In 2018, Abe and Konaka acknowledged that Despera was in development hell, citing the state of the anime industry.

On March 23, 2021, Konaka said that the anime was 80% funded, and that both he and Abe had continued to work on it continually since its conception except for an interruption due to the COVID-19 pandemic.

References

External links
 Animage's Despera official blog 

2009 Japanese novels
Anime series
Light novels
Unaired television shows